The 2004 Interprovincial Hurling Championship was the 77th series of the inter-provincial hurling championship, also known as the Railway Cup. Three matches were played between 23 October 2004 and 5 December 2004 to decide the title. It was contested by Connacht, Leinster, Munster and Ulster.

Leinster entered the championship as the defending champions, however, they were defeated by Munster at the semi-final stage.

On 5 December 2004, Connacht won the Railway Cup after a 1-15 to 0-09 defeat of Munster in the final at Pearse Stadium in Galway. It was their 11th Railway Cup title overall and their first title since 1998.

Connacht's Niall Healy and Munster's Eoin Kelly were the Interprovincial Championship joint top scorers with 0-12 each.

Results

Semi-finals

Final

Top scorers

Overall

Single game

Sources

 Donegan, Des, The Complete Handbook of Gaelic Games (DBA Publications Limited, 2005).

References

Railway Cup Hurling Championship
Railway Cup Hurling Championship